

Events

January–March 
 January 1 – The Allgemeines bürgerliches Gesetzbuch (the Austrian civil code) enters into force in the Austrian Empire.
 January 19 – Peninsular War: The French-held fortress of Ciudad Rodrigo is stormed by the Anglo-Portuguese Army, under the Earl of Wellington.
 February 7 – The last New Madrid earthquake strikes New Madrid, Missouri, with an estimated moment magnitude of over 8.
 February 12 – Napoleon authorizes the usage of Mesures usuelles, the basis of the metric system.
 February 13 – The first Chilean newspaper Aurora de Chile deals with political philosophy, and stands in favor of the new national government.
 February 27
 Argentine War of Independence: Manuel Belgrano raises the Flag of Argentina (which he designed) in the city of Rosario, for the first time.
 English poet Lord Byron gives his first address as a member of the British House of Lords, in defense of Luddite violence against industrialism, in his home county of Nottinghamshire.
 February 24 – Prussia and France sign the Treaty of Paris.
 March 14 – Prussia and Austria sign the Treaty of Paris.
 March 15 – Luddites attack the wool-processing factory of Frank Vickerman in West Yorkshire.
 March 16–April 6 – Siege of Badajoz (Peninsular War): The Anglo-Portuguese Army, under the Earl of Wellington, besieges Badajoz, Spain and forces the surrender of the French garrison.
 March 19 – The Cortes of Cádiz creates the first modern Spanish constitution.
 March 26
 In the United States, the Boston Gazette prints a political cartoon coining the term Gerrymander, after former Massachusetts Governor Elbridge Gerry's approval (on February 11) of legislation creating oddly shaped electoral districts, designed to help incumbents win re-election.
 The 1812 Caracas earthquake destroys Caracas, Venezuela.

April–June 
 April 4 – U.S. President James Madison enacts a 90-day embargo on trade with the United Kingdom.
 April 8 – The capital of Finland is moved from Turku to Helsinki, when Russia's Tsar Alexander I signs an edict moving the Government Council of the Grand Duchy of Finland.
 April 30 – Louisiana is admitted as the 18th U.S. state.
 May 11 – John Bellingham assassinates British Prime Minister Spencer Perceval, in the lobby of the British House of Commons.
 May 16 – Russian field marshal Mikhail Kutuzov signs the Treaty of Bucharest, ending the Russo-Turkish War (1806–12) and annexing Bessarabia to Imperial Russia.
 May 25 – Felling mine disaster: A mine explosion at the Felling colliery near Jarrow, England, leaves 96 dead.
 June 1 – War of 1812: U.S. President James Madison asks the U.S. Congress to declare war on the United Kingdom.
 June 4 – Following Louisiana's admittance as a U.S. state, the territory by that name is renamed the Missouri Territory.
 June 16 – New York State charters the City Bank of New York (later Citibank).
 June 18 – The War of 1812 between the United States, Canada and the United Kingdom begins with US declaration.
 June 24 – Napoleon's Grande Armée crosses the Neman River, and invades Russia.

July–September 
 July 12 – Americans invade Canada at Windsor, Ontario.
 July 18 – Russia's Patriotic War – Battle of Klyastitsy: Kulnev defeats Oudinot, but sustains a mortal wound.
 July 19 - Beethoven and Goethe meet each other at the small Bohemian town Teplitz.
 July 22 – Peninsular War – Battle of Salamanca: British forces led by the Earl of Wellington defeat French troops near Salamanca, Spain.
 August 5 – War of 1812: Tecumseh's Indian force ambushes Thomas Van Horne's 200 Americans at Brownstone Creek, causing them to flee and retreat.
 August 12 – Peninsular War: The combined English and Portuguese army under the command of Wellington enters Madrid, following the Battle of Salamanca.
 August 15 – War of 1812 – Battle of Fort Dearborn: Potawatomi warriors overrun the United States fort in Illinois Territory.
 August 16 – War of 1812: American General William Hull surrenders Fort Detroit, without a fight, to the British Army.
 August 19 – War of 1812:  defeats the British frigate , off the coast of Nova Scotia. The British shot is said to have bounced off Constitutions sides, earning her the nickname "Old Ironsides".
 September 7 – Napoleonic Wars – French invasion of Russia – Battle of Borodino: The bloodiest battle of the Napoleonic Wars ends in a tactical victory for Napoleon. There are at least 70,000 casualties, with a minimum of 6,562 dead from the French Grande Armée alone.
 September 14 – French invasion of Russia and Fire of Moscow: Napoleon's troops enter Moscow, which is deliberately set on fire by Muscovites, on orders of Fyodor Rostopchin.  Later accounts report that France lost 40,000 troops during four days of fire between September 17 and 20, and that 20,000 Russian soldiers were killed in what would be described in 1876 as "the greatest example in history of national self-sacrifice for the destruction of an invader."

October–December 
 October 12 – The capital of the Commonwealth of Pennsylvania, United States, is permanently moved from Lancaster to Harrisburg.
 October 13 – War of 1812 – Battle of Queenston Heights: As part of the Niagara campaign in Ontario, Canada, United States forces under General Stephen Van Rensselaer are repulsed from invading Canada by British and native troops, led by Sir Isaac Brock (who dies during the battle).
 October 18–20 – Second Battle of Polotsk – Russians attack and defeat a Franco-Bavarian force in Belarus.
 October 19 – Napoleon begins his retreat from Moscow.
 October 23 – Malet coup of 1812: General Claude François de Malet attempts unsuccessfully to overthrow the Napoleonic régime in Paris.
 October 24 – Napoleonic Wars – Battle of Maloyaroslavets: An inconclusive encounter between the French vanguard and a Russian force leads Napoleon to decide to retreat along the same line as his advance, with disastrous results.
 November 3 – Napoleonic Wars – Battle of Vyazma: The rearguard of Napoleon's retreating army is defeated.
 November 5 – 1812 United States presidential election: James Madison defeats DeWitt Clinton.
 November 10 – 1812 United Kingdom general election: The Tory Party is victorious, under Robert Jenkinson, 2nd Earl of Liverpool.
 November 15–18 – Napoleonic Wars – Battle of Krasnoi: Napoleon's retreating army is again defeated in a series of skirmishes.
 December 8 – The M6.9–7.5 San Juan Capistrano earthquake affects Alta California with a maximum Mercalli intensity of VII (Very strong) to IX (Violent), killing 40 parishioners at Mission San Juan Capistrano.
 December 14 – The French invasion of Russia comes to an end as the remnants of the Grande Armée are expelled from Russia.
 December 20 – The first volume of Grimms' Fairy Tales is published in Germany.
 December 29 – War of 1812:  defeats the British frigate , off the coast of Brazil.
 December 30 – The Convention of Tauroggen is signed.

Date unknown 
 The Bishop James Madison Society is founded at the College of William & Mary, Williamsburg, Virginia.
 The Woodford Reserve Bourbon whiskey distillery, established in 1780 along Glenn's Creek in Woodford County, Kentucky, passes to the control of Oscar Pepper.
 The Ranikot Fort is reconstructed in Sindh.
 Approximate date – Battle of Shela: The people of Lamu Island are victorious against those from other parts of the Kenya coast.

Births 

 January 6 – Melchora Aquino, Filipino revolutionary hero (d. 1919)
 January 13 – Victor de Laprade, French poet, critic (d. 1883)
 February 3 – William Fraser Tolmie, Scottish-Canadian scientist, politician (d. 1886)
 February 7 – Charles Dickens, English writer (d. 1870)
 February 11 – Alexander Hamilton Stephens, Vice President of the Confederate States of America (d. 1883)
 February 15 – Charles Lewis Tiffany, American jeweler, co-founder of Tiffany & Co. (d. 1902)
 February 18 – Nils Johan Berlin, Swedish chemist, professor (d. 1891)
 February 29 – Sir James Milne Wilson, Premier of Tasmania (d. 1880)
 March 1
 Nicolae Crețulescu, 2-time prime minister of Romania (d. 1900)
 Augustus Pugin, English-born architect (d. 1852)
 March 6 –  Aaron Lufkin Dennison, American watch manufacturer (d. 1895)
 March 22 – Stephen Pearl Andrews, American anarchist, abolitionist (d. 1886)
 April 14 – George Grey, 11th Premier of New Zealand (d. 1898)
 April 20 – Pauline Åhman, Swedish harpist (d. 1904) 
 April 22 – Solomon Caesar Malan, Swiss-born orientalist (d. 1894)
 April 23 – Frederick Whitaker, English-New Zealand lawyer, politician, 5th Prime Minister of New Zealand (d. 1891)
 April 27
 Friedrich von Flotow, German composer (d. 1883)
 William W. Snow, American politician (d. 1886)
 April 29 – Emilie Högquist, Swedish dramatic star (d. 1846)
 May 6 – Madame Restell, American abortion provider (d. 1878)
 May 7 – Robert Browning, English poet (d. 1889)
 May 12 – Edward Lear, English artist, poet (d. 1888)
 June 9 – Johann Gottfried Galle, German astronomer (d. 1910)
 June 13 – Gustavus H. Scott, American admiral (d. 1882)
 June 14 – Fernando Wood, American politician, U.S. House of Representatives from New York and 2-time Mayor of New York City (d. 1881)
 July 2 – Nathaniel de Rothschild, French wine grower (d. 1870)
 July 8 – Louisa Hamilton, Duchess of Abercorn (b. 1905)
 August 8 – John Rodgers, American admiral (d. 1882)
 August 25
 Percival Drayton, United States Navy officer (d. 1865)
 Nikolay Zinin, Russian organic chemist (d. 1880)
 August 27 – Bertalan Szemere, 3rd Prime Minister of Hungary (d. 1869)
 September 2 – William Fox, 2nd Premier of New Zealand (d. 1893)
 September 18 – Herschel Vespasian Johnson, American politician (d. 1880)
 October 12 – Ascanio Sobrero, Italian chemist (d. 1888)
 October 20 – Austin Flint I, American cardiologist (d. 1886) 
 November 14 – Aleardo Aleardi, Italian poet (d. 1878)
 November 19 – Edmond Jurien de La Gravière, French admiral, naval historian, and biographer (d. 1892)
 December 6 – Ana María Martínez de Nisser, Colombian heroine, writer (d. 1872)
 December 8 – Henry Varnum Poor, American financial analyst (d. 1905)
 December 14 – Charles Canning, 1st Earl Canning, British Viceroy of India (d. 1862)
 December 17 – Vilhelm Petersen, Danish painter (d. 1880)
 December 24 – Karl Eduard Zachariae von Lingenthal, German jurist (d. 1894)

Date unknown 
 Louis du Couret, French explorer, military officer, and writer (d. 1867)
 Mohan Lal (Zutshi), Indian traveler (d. 1877)

Deaths 

 January 23 – Robert Craufurd, British general (mortally wounded in battle) (b. 1764)
 February 2 – Isaac Titsingh, Dutch scholar, merchant-trader and ambassador (b. 1745)
 March 7 – Isaac Swainson, English botanist (b. 1746)
 March 11 – Philip James de Loutherbourg, English artist (b. 1740)
 March 18 – John Horne Tooke, English politician and philologist (b. 1736)
 April 14 – William Nicholas (officer), English army officer, at the Siege of Badajoz (b. 1785)
 April 15 – Michael Atkins, Irish actor and theatre manager (b. 1746)
 April 20 – George Clinton, 4th Vice President of the United States (b. 1739)
 April 25 – Edmond Malone, Irish scholar (b. 1741)
 May 11 – Spencer Perceval, Prime Minister of the United Kingdom (assassinated) (b. 1762)
 May 12 – Martha Ballard, American diarist and midwife (b. 1734 or 1735)
 May 18 – John Bellingham, British assassin of Spencer Perceval (b. 1769)
 July 4 – Victurnien-Jean-Baptiste de Rochechouart de Mortemart, French general and politician (b. 1752)
 August 1 – Yakov Kulnev, one of the most popular Russian military leaders at the time of the Napoleonic Wars, general (b. 1763).
 August 12 
 Anna Strong, Patriot spy during the American Revolutionary War (b. 1740)
William Booth, English farmer, hung for forgery (baptised 1776)
 August 30 – George Mathews, American army officer and politician (b. 1739)
 September 13 – Leonardo Bravo, Mexican general who fought in the Mexican War of Independence, father of Nicolas Bravo, executed (b. 1764)
 September 19 
 Auguste-Jean-Gabriel de Caulaincourt, French general  (b. 1777)
 Mayer Amschel Rothschild, German banker (b. 1744)
 September 21 – Emanuel Schikaneder, German dramatist, actor and singer (b. 1751)
 September 24
 Pyotr Bagration, Russian general and prince of Georgian origin (b. 1765)
 Juana Galán, Spanish heroine (b. 1787)
 October 13 – Isaac Brock, British general (killed in action) (b. 1769)
 December 15 – Schneur Zalman, Polish rabbi and founder of the Chabad-Lubavitch movement (b. 1745)
 December 20 – Sacagawea, Shoshone guide (b. ca. 1788)
 December 24 – George Beck, American artist and poet (b. 1749)

See also 
 1784

References

Further reading
 

 
Leap years in the Gregorian calendar